Aaron Lansky (born June 17, 1955 in New Bedford, Massachusetts) is the founder of the Yiddish Book Center, an organization he created to help salvage Yiddish language publications. He received a MacArthur Fellowship in 1989 for his work.

Lansky is the author of Outwitting History (2004), an autobiographical account of how he saved the Yiddish books of the world, from the 1970s to the present day.  It won the 2005 Massachusetts Book Award.  A children’s book called “The Book Rescuer: How a Mensch from Massachusetts Saved Yiddish Literature for Generations to Come” also tells his story.

Education
Lansky graduated from Hampshire College in 1977 with a B.A. in modern Jewish history, and went on to a graduate program in East European Jewish studies at McGill University in Montreal.

Notes 

1955 births
Living people
20th-century American Jews
MacArthur Fellows
Yiddish-language literature
Hampshire College alumni
McGill University alumni
21st-century American Jews